CCIR System L is an analog broadcast television system used in France, Luxembourg, Monaco and Chausey. It was the last system to use positive video modulation and AM sound.

Initially adopted in the 1970s and associated with the SECAM color system (SECAM-L), it was discontinued in 2011, when France transitioned to Digital Video Broadcasting.

Specifications 
The main System L specifications are listed below.

Television channels were arranged as follows:

See also 

Broadcast television systems
Television transmitter
Transposer

Notes and references

External links 
 ITU, Characteristics of television systems
 World Analogue Television Standards and Waveforms
 Fernsehnormen aller Staaten und Gebiete der Welt

ITU-R recommendations
Television technology
L, System
Broadcast engineering
CCIR System